Swearin' is the debut album by the band of the same name, originally released on June 1, 2012, on vinyl, and re-released four months later, in October, on compact disk. The New York Times' Jon Caramanica described the album as "hops among various stripes of punk and ’90s indie rock." He also said that on the album, "There are heavy echoes of riot grrrl, especially on “Shrinking Violet,” on which Allison is ferocious: “Your idea of a good time/is my idea of a violent crime.”"

Track listing
1
Here to Hear
Kenosha
Fat Chance
Shrinking Violet
Divine/Mimosa
Hundreds & Thousands
Just
Crashing
Kill ‘em with Kindness
Empty Head
Movie Star

References

2012 debut albums
Swearin' albums